Kutscher is a German surname. Notable people with the surname include:

Arthur Kutscher (1878–1960), German historian
Hans Kutscher (1911–1993), German judge
Marco Kutscher (born 1975), German equestrian
Martín Kutscher (born 1984), Uruguayan swimmer
Paul Kutscher (born 1977), Uruguayan swimmer
Yechezkel Kutscher (1909–1971), Israeli philologist

German-language surnames